Mohammed AlSharekh (Kuwait, 1942) is a Kuwaiti entrepreneur and author, he is the founder and Chairman Emeritus of Sakhr Software Company. Through Sakhr, he introduced the first Arabic language Operating System into computers.

Early life and education 
AlSharekh was born in Kuwait in 1942. He holds a Bachelor's degree in Economics and Political Science from Cairo University in 1965, and earned his master's degree in Development Economics in 1968 from Williams College in the State of Massachusetts, US.

Career 
AlSharekh served as the Deputy Director-General for the Kuwait Fund for Arab Economic Development from 1969 to 1973, as a representative of Kuwait and Arab Group of the International Bank for Reconstruction and Development (I.B.R.D), Washington D.C. from 1973 to 1975 and co-founded and chaired the Board of Directors of the Industrial Bank of Kuwait, he also served as Vice Chairman of the Association of Arab Economists.
In 1980, he founded AlAlamiah Group with headquarters in Kuwait and the Kingdom of Saudi Arabia and established Sakhr Software Company as a project to introduce the Arabic language into computers in 1982. Upon that, worked on the research and development of Arabic NLP (Natural Language Processing) which led to the development of the Arabic OCR, Arabic machine translation, and Arabic automatic speech recognition.
In 1997, AlSharekh founded Book in a Newspaper project in collaboration with UNESCO. In 1987, he was one of the financiers of the Center for Arab Unity Studies and the Arab Organization for Translation, and the Institut du Monde Arabe in 1987. AlSharekh developed the first Quran computer software, in addition to the nine Hadith books software in English, the Islamic Information Archive, OCR in 1994, Arabic Text to Speech in 1998, Machine translation from and into Arabic in 2002, automatic speech translation in 2010 and developing more than 90 educational and coding programs for the Arab youth.

Sakhr Software Company 
In 1982, AlSharekh established Sakhr Software Company as a Kuwaiti subsidiary of AlAlamiah Group, which moved its headquarters to Cairo during the invasion of Kuwait in 1990. The company developed a new generation of Arabic Natural Language Processing (NLP) techniques that were used in the development of automated morphology and automatic diacritizer which took over 10 years for completion. The company obtained three patents from the USPTO in the field of Arabic language for automatic pronunciation, automatic translation and OCR.

Contemporary Arabic Lexicon 
Contemporary Arabic Lexicon is a contemporary computerized dictionary of the Arabic language, which was released online for free in 2019, contains 125,000 meanings and structures, as well as a database amounting to 35,000 synonyms and antonyms. The website also includes three dictionaries which are Al-Qāmus al-Muḥīṭ, Taj al-Arus and Lisān al-ʿArab.

AlSharekh Archives 
The archive includes 250 magazines with 13 thousand issues that were issued from the late 19th century until 2010. Also includes more than a 250 thousand articles of various topics by 20 thousand writers from Arab and non-Arab countries.

Patents 
During his tenure, Sakhr Software Company obtained three patents from the United States Patent and Trademark Office:

 Arabic handwriting recognition using feature matching.
 Determining a compact model to transcribe the arabic language acoustically in a well defined basic phonetic study.
 Method and system for theme-based word sense ambiguity reduction.

Achievements and awards 
 King Faisal International Prize — 2021
State Prize, the National Council for Culture, Arts, and Letters (NCCAL) — 2018
World Summit Awards — 2007
E-Inclusion Award — 2007
Outstanding Achievement Award in the field of Localization — 2005
Foundation Pioneer Award — 2004
E-Achievement Award E-Visionary of the Year, Arabian Business — 2002
The best products award, Comdex's exhibition, Egypt — 1998
Gulf Success Forum Award — 1996

Private holdings 
AlSharekh has many private holdings that consisted of paintings from Arabian and Egyptian art by several well-known Arab and non-Arab artists, according to the Kuwaiti newspaper, Al-Jarida, his art collection is sufficient to establish a private museum.

Published works 
In 1968, AlSharekh published his first work Qais and Laila in the avant-garde sixties magazine Gallery and has three published short stories, Ten Stories published in 2006, Al-Saha published in 2012 and Secrets published in 2017, and a novel entitled The Family, published in 2018.

References 

Living people
Kuwaiti businesspeople
20th-century Kuwaiti businesspeople
21st-century Kuwaiti businesspeople
1942 births